Lino Toffolo (31 December 1934 – 16 May 2016) was an Italian actor, singer-songwriter, author, and television presenter.

Life and career 
Born in  Murano (Venice), shortly after his debut he moved to Milan where he obtained his first successes in "Derby Club", performing the character of the drunkard who sang his songs in Venetian dialect.  Toffolo made his film debut in 1968, in Chimera. He appeared in 24 titles between 1968 and 1978, including films by Dino Risi, Mario Monicelli, Salvatore Samperi, Pasquale Festa Campanile, then focused his works on stage and on television.

His variegated career includes three music albums and several music singles, of which the most successful was "Johnny Bassotto", that in 1972 ranked 2 in the Italian Hit Parade. Toffolo even wrote two books, A Ramengo and A Gratis, and is the author of two theatrical plays, Gelati caldi and Fisimat.

Selected filmography 
 I Vitelloni (1953) - Un ragazzo al carnevale (uncredited)
 Chimera (1968) - Sammarco
 I quattro del pater noster (1969) - Paul
 When Women Had Tails (1970) - Put
 Brancaleone at the Crusades (1970) - Panigotto
 Million Dollar Eel (1971) - Giovanni Boscolo 'Bissa'
 The Naked Cello (1971) - Cavalmoretti
 In Love, Every Pleasure Has Its Pain (1971) - Bazzarello
 When Women Lost Their Tails (1972) - Put
 Cause of Divorce (1972) - Vladimiro Pellegrini
 Beati i ricchi (1972) - Geremia
 Little Funny Guy (1973) - Italian anarchist
 Lovers and Other Relatives (1974) - Lino
 La bellissima estate (1974) - Red Baron
 Yuppi du (1975) - Nane
 The Sensuous Nurse (1975) - Giovanni Garbin
 Lunatics and Lovers (1976) - Gondrano Rossi
 Sturmtruppen (1976) - Una recluta
 The Career of a Chambermaid (1976) - Agostino
 Messalina, Messalina! (1977) - Giulio Nelio, the Man from Venice
 Scherzi da prete (1978) - Monsignor Cassola
 L'inquilina del piano di sopra (1978) - Arturo Canestrari
 One Day More (2011) - Fausto

References

External links 
 

1934 births
2016 deaths
Italian male film actors
Italian male stage actors
Italian television presenters
Italian male television actors
Actors from the Metropolitan City of Venice
Italian male singers
Italian pop singers